Raparna ochreipennis is a species of moth of the family Erebidae first described by Frederic Moore in 1882.

Distribution
It is found in India and Nepal.

References

External links
Sachin Gurule's images at Flickr

Boletobiinae